Cambria County Jail is a historic jail located in downtown Ebensburg, Cambria County, Pennsylvania.

History 
In April of 1870 the Cambria Freeman newspaper wrote, "[T]he commissioners of Cambria County purchased from Mrs. E.J. McDonald a square of land bounded by Centre [sic], Crawford, and Sample streets on which to erect the proposed new county prison. The price was $2,500."

Critics in Johnstown referred to it as a "Welsh castle" in ridicule, which was also a knock on Ebensburg's Welsh roots.

In the spring of 1997 the "Old Stone Jail" was abandoned for a new facility and temporarily was turned into a records center in a $400,000 project.

Escape of Michael "Smitty" Smith 
Convicted in 1884 of killing a man from Johnstown, Smitty was set to be hung the next day. But after leaving a farewell letter to the warden, he managed to escape. Smitty would have been the fourth execution at the jail. He was never found. Reenactments of how Smitty may have escaped have been performed and his cell was the site of an exhibition hosted by the Cambria County Historical Society which included a recreated noose by his height and weight.

Architecture

It was built in 1872, and is a Gothic Revival style sandstone building measuring 56 feet wide, 100 feet deep, and 60 feet tall. An addition, (a new cell block) was built in 1910.  The front façade features pointed drop arch windows and a pointed arch portal. The building also has a tower.

It was added to the National Register of Historic Places in 1980.

In the media

Television
The Cambria County Jail was featured as a haunted location on the season 3 episode of Paranormal Lockdown, titled "Old Cambria Jail", which aired on Destination America in 2018. Paranormal investigators Nick Groff and Katrina Weidman spent 72-hours locked down in the jail to investigate the legend Michael "Smitty" Smith, an inmate who mysteriously disappeared from a locked cell on the night of his execution in 1884.

The Travel Channel's television show Destination Fear filmed at the location for the fifth episode of their second season in 2020.

References

External links

Jails on the National Register of Historic Places in Pennsylvania
Gothic Revival architecture in Pennsylvania
Government buildings completed in 1872
Buildings and structures in Cambria County, Pennsylvania
National Register of Historic Places in Cambria County, Pennsylvania
Jails in Pennsylvania